Kathleen Tara Moran (born 1 June 1971 in Leeds, West Riding of Yorkshire) is an actress.

Moran's television debut was in Yorkshire Television's educational history series for schools, How We Used to Live. During the mid-1980s she played Alice Selby in Series 5 (covering 1902–1926) and Susan Brady in Series 6 (1954–1970).

She has appeared as Chelsea Richards, alongside a young Jude Law, in ITV's Cheshire-set soap opera Families; as Mary Skillet in Casualty; Felicity Barnes in EastEnders; Helen in Take Me; Anne Moore in A Touch of Frost; Katrina Webb in a 2005 episode of Shameless and Christine Carter in Coronation Street.

During 2006–2007 Moran played the recurring guest role of Shelly Fitzgerald in ITV's long-running police drama series The Bill, in which her character was eventually discovered to be the abductor of missing child Amy Tennant.

References

External links

English television actresses
English soap opera actresses
Actresses from Leeds
1971 births
Living people